Jean-Georges Paulus (5 August 1816 – 14 April 1898), was a French musician, conductor of music from 1848 to 1873 and founder of the French Republican Guard Band.

Biography 

Born in Haguenau (Bas-Rhin), he was the son of a coffee maker, Jean-Georges Paulus and Madeleine Schmitt.

In 1835, Paulus won a first prize for clarinet at the Conservatoire de Paris. He later became music chief on the ships Hercule and La Belle Poule, where he participated in the ceremonies of the retour des cendres of Napoléon. He was officially appointed Music Director of François d'Orléans, Prince of Joinville.

From 1848 to 1864, he founded and conducted the Fanfare band of the Republican Guard of Paris, which then developed to form the French Republican Guard Band.

Paulus died at his home in the 7th arrondissement of Paris 14 April 1898.

Awards 
 Chevalier of the Légion d'honneur (12 August 1864 decree)
 Chevalier of the Ordre des Palmes Académiques

Sources 
 Jean-Loup Mayol, "Jean-Georges Paulus", in 150 ans de musique à la Garde Républicaine : mémoires d'un orchestre, Connétable, Paris, 1998,  
 Prosper Suiter, "Jean Georges Paulus, chef de la musique de la Garde Républicaine", in Elsaß-Lothringische Gesang und Musikzeitung, 1911, issue n° 10,

References

External links 
« Le lieutenant Jean-Georges Paulus », Garde républicaine.
Histoire de la Fanfare de la Garde Républicaine.

1816 births
People from Haguenau
1898 deaths
Conservatoire de Paris alumni
French classical clarinetists
Officers of the National Gendarmerie
Chevaliers of the Légion d'honneur
Chevaliers of the Ordre des Palmes Académiques
French Republican Guard Band musicians
19th-century classical musicians